Zweerts is a Dutch patronymic surname. it may refer to:
Frank Zweerts (born 1943), Dutch field hockey player
Jeroen Zweerts (born 1945), Dutch field hockey player, brother of Frank

See also
Zwiers, surname of the same origin

Dutch-language surnames
Patronymic surnames